The 2004–05 Nevada Wolf Pack men's basketball team represented the University of Nevada, Reno during the 2003–04 NCAA Division I men's basketball season. The Wolf Pack, led by former assistant and first-year head coach Mark Fox, played their home games at the Lawlor Events Center on their campus in Reno, Nevada as members of the Western Athletic Conference (WAC).

After finishing atop the conference regular season standings, Nevada was upset in the quarterfinal round of the WAC tournament, but did receive an at-large bid to the NCAA tournament as No. 9 seed in the Chicago Region. The Wolf Pack defeated Texas in the opening round before falling to No. 1 overall seed and eventual National runner-up Illinois in the round of 32. This was the second straight season where Nevada's season was ended by the National runner-up. The team finished with a record of 25–7 (16–2 WAC).

Roster

Schedule and results

|-
!colspan=9 style=| Regular season

|-
!colspan=9 style=| WAC tournament

|-
!colspan=9 style=| NCAA tournament

Source

Rankings

References

Nevada Wolf Pack men's basketball seasons
Nevada
Nevada
Nevada Wolf Pack
Nevada Wolf Pack